The first season of the American television series Tough as Nails premiered on CBS on July 8, 2020, and concluded on September 2, 2020. The season was won by Marine Corps veteran Kelly "Murph" Murphy, with drywaller Danny Moody finishing second, and forestry tech Myles V. Polk placing third.

Cast

Future appearances
Danny Moody and Lee Marshall appeared on the second season as judges during the penultimate episode's challenges. Kelly "Murph" Murphy appeared on the third season during the first challenge at Marine Corps Base Camp Pendleton.

Cast progress 

 The contestant won Tough as Nails.
 The contestant was declared the runner-up.
 The contestant was declared the third place finisher.
 The contestant placed the highest in the individual competition and won the challenge.
 The contestant placed the second highest in the individual competition and was ultimately declared safe.
 The contestant was safe from elimination.
 The contestant placed the second lowest in the individual competition but was ultimately declared safe.
 The contestant placed the lowest in the individual competition and competed in the overtime challenge but ultimately survived.
 The contestant was the loser of the overtime challenge and was eliminated from the individual competition.

Team progress 

 Won the team challenge.
 Lost the team challenge.

Production 
On October 3, 2019, it was announced that CBS had ordered Tough as Nails with a 10-episode order. Phil Keoghan hosts the series and serves as executive producer alongside his wife, Louise. In early November, a nationwide casting search took place in the cities of St. Louis, Chicago, Detroit, New York City, Cincinnati, and Las Vegas. On April 29, 2020, it was announced that the series would premiere on July 8, 2020, later making it a two-hour premiere.

Episodes

References 

2020 American television seasons
Tough as Nails